The 2019–20 Danish Cup, also known as Sydbank Pokalen, was the 66th season of the Danish Cup competition. The winners of the tournament, SønderjyskE, in winning their first major championship in club history, earned qualification into the second qualifying round of the 2020–21 UEFA Europa League.

Structure
In the first round, there 88 teams participated, coming from all levels of competition. Eight additional teams joined in round two and the top six teams from the 2018-19 Danish Superliga entered the 3rd round.

Notable Dates
The draw date and matchdays for the 2019–20 Sydbank Pokalen were as follows:
First Round Draw – July 2, 2019
First Round – August 6–8, 2019
Second Round Draw – August 15, 2019
Second Round – September 3–5, 2019
Third Round – September 24–26, 2019
Fourth Round – October 29–31, 2019
Quarterfinals – March 3–5, 2020
Semifinals – April 22–23, 2020
Final – May 21, 2020

Participants
102 teams will compete for the Danish Cup. All teams from the top three divisions in 2018–19 were automatically entered while lower division teams played qualifying matches to enter the competition.

First round
In the first round of the tournament the teams were divided into a West and East pool. In the West Pool, 46 teams participated, divided into two groups, "Funen / Southern Jutland" and " Middle / North Jutland". The East Pool consisted of 42 teams and was divided into the "Zealand 1" and "Zealand 2" groups.

The draw was held on Friday, 2 July 2019.

Middle / North Jutland

Funen / South Jutland

Zealand 1

Zealand 2

Second round
The draw was held on 15th August 2019.

There were

 44 teams from the 1st round (winners)
 4 teams from the 1st division (1st–4th placed)
 8 teams from the Superliga (5th–12th placed)

Third round
The draw was held on 12th September 2019.

There were

 28 teams from the 2nd round (winners)
 4 teams from the 3F Superliga (1st–4th placed)

Fourth round
The draw was held after the match Fremad Amager-FC Midtjylland, 26th September 2019.

There were 16 winners from the previous round.

Quarter-finals

Semi-finals

Final

References

External links
Danish Cup 2019/2020 summary(SOCCERWAY)
Danish Cup 2019/2020 summary (in danish) (DBU)

2019–20
2019–20 European domestic association football cups
Cup